I'll Be Seeing You is an album by Canadian artist Anne Murray. It was released by Straightway Records on October 19, 2004. The album was re-released as All of Me in 2005 with a bonus greatest hits disc included.

Track listing

References

2004 albums
Anne Murray albums